Åsa Svensson (born Carlsson; 16 June 1975) is a former tennis player from Sweden, who turned professional in 1992. She won two singles and seven doubles titles in her career. The right-hander reached her highest individual ranking on the WTA Tour on 1 April 1996, when she became the No. 28 of the world.

Biography
Svensson trained at the Royal Lawn Tennis Club in Stockholm. She married Niclas Svensson on 8 December 2001 and travelled with him on the tour. Her maiden name is Carlsson, her father's name is Lennart, mother's name is Signe.

In January 2005, she announced she gave up tennis.

WTA career finals

Singles: 4 (2 titles, 2 runner-ups)

Doubles: 16 (7 titles, 9 runner-ups)

ITF finals

Singles: 8 (3–5)

Doubles: 8 (6–2)

Best Grand Slam results details

References

External links
 
 
 

1975 births
Hopman Cup competitors
Living people
People from Surahammar Municipality
Swedish female tennis players
Sportspeople from Västmanland County